() is a form of folk dance originating from the Okinawa Islands, Japan. In origin, it is a Bon dance that is performed by young people of each community during the Bon festival to honor the spirits of their ancestors. It underwent drastic changes in the 20th century and is today seen as a vital part of Okinawan culture.

Popular style 
The dancers also sometimes play small hand gongs and  castanets.  dancers wear various costumes, usually according to local tradition and gender of the dancer; modern costumes are often brightly colored and feature a characteristic, colorful knotted turban. Special vests, leggings, and shoes are also popular.

History

Origin 
This theory is no longer supported. The standardization of the written form was relatively new.

The core of  consists of  songs. According to the record, he translated Buddhist teaching into the vernacular speech and taught it to the people of Naha during the reign of Shō Nei. Other sources confirm that Taichū stayed in the capital region for three years in the early 1600s and converted the king and other high-ranking officials. Some researchers speculate that he introduced  or dancing nembutsu to Naha. However, Taichū's teaching did not prevail; it was barely carried on by his followers in Kakinohana, Naha.

One is that it indicates their origin, Kyoto. The other is that its founder was named . The fact that their origin had been obscured by the early 18th century suggests that they came from mainland Japan a long time ago. Based on modern-day Shuri Kubagawa-chō (part of the capital Shuri), they performed puppet plays, chanted  on celebratory occasions and sang nembutsu songs as a funeral service. It is uncertain if the  performed  from the very beginning or learned later from a different group. Unlike Taichū's followers, they wandered around Okinawa Island.

In the Yaeyama Islands, Bon dance is usually called  and is accompanied with  songs. The Amami Islands also have  songs, but at least some of them may belong to a tradition different from Okinawa's .

Pre-World War II traditions 
It is not clear when  songs spread to central Okinawa, which later played a central role in transforming . According to an oral tradition,  was introduced to Kamiyama, Ginowan in the Meiji period, when a wealthy farmer invited performers from Shuri and made them teach Bon dance to young villagers. The community of Ganeko, Ginowan has a similar oral history. It appears that  spread to northern Okinawa from the late Meiji period to the early Shōwa period. Several communities in northern Okinawa believe that  was introduced from Sesoko, Motobu, a supplying center of seasonal workers.

It has also developed regional variants. Kobayashi Yukio, a researcher of Okinawan folk songs, classified various forms of  into four groups:
 : mainly performed in central Okinawa. A parade is led by male drummers and is followed by female or mixed dancers. A dozen songs are performed in a mid-tempo.
 : distributed in Uruma of midwestern Okinawa. A parade led by hand drummers and followed by a mixed group of men and women. A dozen songs are performed in an unhurried tempo.
 Drumless : typical of the Motobu Peninsula (Nago, Motobu and Nakijin) in northern Okinawa. Men and women line up in a circle around a wooden scaffold where  is played. Dancers use no drum. A dozen to twenty songs are performed in a fast tempo.
 Female : distributed in the northern end of Okinawa. A dozen to twenty songs with varying tempo are performed solely by women.

Kobayashi Yukio analyzes modern Eisa as a result of the effort by each community's newly organized youth associations, an influence from sophisticated theatrical performance of Naha, and a social movement of modernization that forced young people to turn from "sexually explicit" gatherings to the "healthy" dance.

 was to be performed at the Bon Festival. It is not known when it extended to other occasions. Newspaper articles confirm that , together with other folk performing arts, had been performed as an attraction at various government-sponsored exhibitions in central Okinawa already in 1900s.

Post-World War II transformation 
 underwent drastic changes in post-World War II Okinawa. In 1956, then under U.S. occupation, the first  Contest was held in Koza (part of the modern-day Okinawa City). It was originally an effort to recover from the great damage to the base-dependent commercial city caused by the "Off Limits" ordinance by the U.S. military. As a contest, participating groups were judged by screening criteria such as costumes, formation, technique, the number of performers, and innovativeness. Folklorist Kumada Susumu noted values imposed by the criteria. They clearly emphasized group dynamics, although earlier groups were not necessarily large. In fact it was not uncommon to wear Western clothing during the performance.

Another major event, the "Youth  Festival," began in Naha in 1964, originally under the name of "All Okinawa  Contest." At first, both events were competitive. In 1975, the latter abolished the contest and changed itself into a non-competitive festival, which was followed by the former in 1977. One reason behind the change was that some youth associations started showing their dissatisfaction at values imposed by the contests.  had changed itself into spectacular group dynamics that was to fascinate the audience. To give the performance more punch, participating groups adopted an increasingly large number of drums. The adoption of luxurious uniforms was another effort to win the contest.

A theme park, Ryukyu Village, is created showcasing traditional Ryukyuan attire and the daily work of weaving cloth, grinding sugar cane, and performance of the  dance.

Creative  
Whereas traditionally  groups consist of people from a village or community due to the sacredness of the activity in honoring the ancestors of a specific community, creative  teams are usually independent of local communities, and admit anyone regardless of their heritage. Creative  is characterized largely by its song selection, with groups usually choosing to dance to newer songs, rather than the traditional standards. Hidekatsu, a Taketomi-born Ryukyu music artist, has become one of the most popular artists that creative  groups dance to. His hit song, has become one of the most frequently performed creative  dances. Hidekatsu is unique in that his songs are almost entirely sung in the Ryukyuan languages, which is a marked departure from most modern day Ryukyu pop singers, who sing primarily in Japanese, making Hidekatsu's music a vital link for young modern Ryukyuans to the languages of their ancestors, who otherwise receive little exposure to the languages. All of the Ryukyu languages are endangered due to over a century of social and political prejudice against the Ryukyu languages by the Japanese government. 

, formed in 1982, was one of the first creative  clubs, and has since expanded to form chapters in mainland Japan, Hawaiʻi, the mainland United States, and other locations with Okinawan populations. Whereas traditionally men would dance  utilizing drums, while women would dance drumless, creative  features many females who choose to dance with drums.  

In addition to having the freedom of dancing to new songs, creative  groups often create their own choreographies, typically using elements of traditional  and karate.  

Since its formation, creative  has become hugely popular in Okinawa, and has also been exported to the Miyako and Yaeyama Islands, Yoron Island (1992) Okinoerabu Island (1993), Kagoshima Prefecture, and to the Kantō and Kansai regions, where people of Okinawan descent concentrated. Creative  has also been exported internationally to virtually anywhere with sizeable Okinawan populations, such as Hawaiʻi, the continental United States, and South America. 

For many young Ryukyuans in the 21st century, creative  has become an integral part of their cultural identity, providing a vital link between tradition and modern creativity. 

One consequence of the rise of creative  is a crisis in authenticity. In response, youth associations increasingly see their community-based  as Okinawan tradition although the perceived tradition is a result of "growing pains" up to 1970s.

See also 
Ryukyukoku Matsuri Daiko Hawaii
Ryukyukoku Matsuri Daiko North Carolina

References

Further reading 
 Christopher T. Nelson, "Dancing with the Dead: Memory, Performance and Everyday Life in Postwar Okinawa." Durham: Duke University Press, 2008.
 Eisa by Manabu Ooshiro, trans. by Marie Yamazato.  Yui Publishing Co. for Okinawa Department of Culture and Environment, Cultural and International Affairs Bureau, Culture Promotion Division, Naha City, 1998.
 Henry Johnson (2008), "Recontextualizing Eisa: Transformations in Religious, Competition, Festival and Tourism Contexts", in Performing Japan: Contemporary expressions of cultural identity, edited by Henry Johnson and Jerry Jaffe. Folkestone, UK: Global Oriental, pp. 196-220.

External links

 Okinawa Zento Eisa Matsuri
 Youth Furusato Eisa Festival
 Eisa dance  troupe performing block-to-block in a neighborhood in Chatan, Okinawa.

Dances of Japan
Group dances
Ritual dances
Culture in Okinawa Prefecture
Festivals in Okinawa Prefecture